Charles Kinsolving could refer to: 

Charles J. Kinsolving III (1904-1984), Bishop of the Episcopal Diocese of Rio Grande
Charles Lester Kinsolving (1927-2019), American talk radio host